The Unionist Party (Partido Unionista) is a conservative political party in Guatemala, who advocates the re-creation of a Central American union. 

The party has been a member of the centre-right International Democrat Union since 2008 and is associated with the Union of Latin American Parties.

It is not to be confused with the party of the same name formed in 1920.

History 

The party orginated from a split experienced by the National Advancement Party in 2000 after Álvaro Arzú lost his standing in the party, prompting him to establish the Unionist Party with old companions and functionaries during his time as president.

At the legislative elections, 9 November 2003, the party won 6.2% of the popular vote and 7 out of 158 seats. Its presidential candidate Fritz García Gallont won 3.0% at the presidential elections of the same day. 

At the 2007 elections, the party again chose García Gallont as its presidential candidate. He won about 2.9% of the vote. The party won 6.2% of the national vote and 6 seats in the congressional elections.

The party was reduced to 2.7% of the nationwide vote at the elections in 2011, thereby retaining a single legislator in Congress. Their presidential candidate was Patricia Escobar, who won close to 2.2% of the electorate.

For the elections in 2015 the party entered into an alliance with Commitment, Renewal and Order. The unified list was able to garner approximately 5.7% of the vote in the congressional elections, increasing their share of seats to 5. The alliance nominated Roberto González Díaz-Durán as their presidential candidate, who gained about 3.5% in the elections.

In January 2018, in return for their support of president Jimmy Morales, General Secretay Álvaro Arzú Escobar was elected as President of the Congress.

In February 2019, Arzú Escobar was one of the most vocal opponents of the International Commission against Impunity in Guatemala (CICIG) and supported a decree terminating the agreement between the UN and Guatemala.

In June 2019, the leading prosecutor of the Special Prosecutor's Office against Impunity (FECI) Juan Francisco Sandoval brought charges of embezzlement and fraud against the mayor of Guatemala City, Ricardo Quiñónez Lemus. The proceedings had to be stopped in January 2021, after the CSJ determined that the prosecutorial immunity of the mayor can not be revoked. In the same month, Héctor Cifuentes was also arrested for illegal party financing, but after changes to the law in 2022, charges were dropped in October 2022 and he was released.
The party was one of nine parties that rejected a four-point minimum compromise on human rights, initiated by the Human Rights Ombudsman and the Guatemalan office of the OHCHR.

The party contested the elections in 2019 on their own again and achieved 2.9% of the national vote in the legislative elections, thereby electing 3 legislators to Congress. The party contested the presidential elections with Pablo Duarte and Roberto Villeda as their ticket, falling to 1.4% of the vote.

In October 2019, the party supported the impeachment of the Ombudsman for Human Rights, Jordán Rodas, for his alleged inaction in five different cases, in Congress. The motion failed to reach the required quorum.

On 5 August 2022, the party announced they would enter into a political alliance with Valor to contest the upcoming election in 2023 together. The agreement was officialised at the national convention of the party on 11 December 2022, where the slate of candidates for Congress and the presidential candidate duo were proclaimed. The alliance nominated Zury Ríos and Héctor Cifuentes as presidential and vice-presidential candidate, respectively.

Election results

Congress of the Republic

President of the Republic of Guatemala

Notes

References

External links

2002 establishments in Guatemala
Conservative parties in Guatemala
International Democrat Union member parties
Nationalist parties in Guatemala
Political parties established in 2002
Protestantism in Guatemala
Protestant political parties